Delazian (also Romanized as Delāzīān, Delāzeyān, Delāzīyān, Delāzīyān, and Deliāzān; also known as Dalījān) is a village in Howmeh Rural District, in the Central District of Semnan County, Semnan Province, Iran. At the 2006 census, its population was 120, in 44 families.
The archaeological mound site of Delazian is located near the village. This site was surveyed and documented by Mohammad Mehryar and Ahmad Kabiri in the 1984s. The site contains 2nd and 1st mill BC occupational remains. The Discovery of the Pointed barrel vault was the most important architectural remains in this important site.

References 

Populated places in Semnan County